The 2022 Pacific typhoon season was the third consecutive season to have below-average tropical cyclone activity, with twenty-five named storms, although it was more active than the previous seasons by named storm count. Ten became typhoons, and three of those intensified into super typhoons. This low activity was caused by an unusually strong La Niña that had persisted from 2020. The season's first named storm, Malakas, developed on April 6, while the last named storm, Pakhar, dissipated on December 12. The season's first typhoon, Malakas, reached typhoon status on April 12. The season ran throughout 2022, though most tropical cyclones typically develop between May and October. Tropical storms Megi and Nalgae were responsible for more than half of the casualties, while typhoons Hinnamnor and Nanmadol both caused $1 billion in damages.

The scope of this article is limited to the Pacific Ocean to the north of the equator between 100°E and 180th meridian. Within the northwestern Pacific Ocean, there are two separate agencies that assign names to tropical cyclones which can often result in a cyclone having two names. The Japan Meteorological Agency (JMA) will name a tropical cyclone should it be judged to have 10-minute sustained wind speeds of at least  anywhere in the basin, whilst the Philippine Atmospheric, Geophysical and Astronomical Services Administration (PAGASA) assigns names to tropical cyclones which move into or form as a tropical depression in the Philippine Area of Responsibility (PAR) located between 135°E and 115°E and between 5°N–25°N regardless of whether or not a tropical cyclone has already been given a name by the JMA. Tropical depressions that are monitored by the United States' Joint Typhoon Warning Center (JTWC) are given a number with a "W" suffix.  


Seasonal forecasts

During the year several national meteorological services and scientific agencies forecast how many tropical cyclones, tropical storms, and typhoons will form during a season and/or how many tropical cyclones will affect a particular country. These agencies included the Tropical Storm Risk (TSR) Consortium of University College London, PAGASA and Taiwan's Central Weather Bureau. The first forecast was released by PAGASA on December 22, 2021, in their monthly seasonal climate outlook predicting the first half of 2022. They predicted that only 0–3 tropical cyclones were expected to form or enter the Philippine Area of Responsibility between January and March, while 1–4 tropical cyclones are expected to form between April and June. PAGASA also stated that ongoing La Niña conditions could last until it transitions back into ENSO-neutral conditions by the second quarter of 2022.

On May 5, Tropical Storm Risk (TSR) issued its first forecast for the 2022 season with ongoing La Niña still anticipated until roughly the third quarter of the year, TSR predicted that tropical activity for 2022 will be slightly below average predicting 23 named storms, 13 typhoons and 7 intense typhoons. TSR remained constant with their prediction in their second forecast in July. On August 9, TSR released their third and final forecast for the season, with the only changes is increasing their typhoon numbers by 14, and decreasing the intense typhoon numbers down to 6. The ACE Index forecast was significantly lowered to 166, and was based on the then-current index as of early August and the reduction of cyclonic activity in the month of June.

Seasonal summary 

The first two months of 2022 were relatively quiet in the Western Pacific Ocean, with no storms forming. In the final week of March, a tropical depression formed west of Palawan and headed for Vietnam, and received the designation of 01W from the Joint Typhoon Warning Center, but the system did not last long and dissipated the next day. In early April, the systems designated as 02W and 03W formed. 02W went on to become Tropical Storm Malakas, which later intensified into the first tropical storm, and later the first typhoon of the season. It also received the name Basyang from PAGASA, but only lasted 5 hours inside the Philippine Area of Responsibility. 03W received the name Agaton from PAGASA and first struck Guiuan in Eastern Visayas before eventually moving westward, and later intensifying into Tropical Storm Megi. Megi brought catastrophic flooding and landslides to the country as it remained almost stationary in Leyte Gulf before making landfall, which effectively made it the deadliest tropical cyclone ever recorded in the month of April in the Philippines. Megi later dissipated on April 13, as Malakas developed into a Category 4-equivalent typhoon. Malakas then began to rapidly weaken as it headed northeast and became extratropical, and the basin quieted down for the rest of April. No named storms formed during the entirety of May, with a minor tropical depression forming east of Mindanao on May 30, and later dissipated on that day. 

Nearing the end of June, a tropical depression formed west of Luzon where it received the name Caloy by the PAGASA. Caloy then intensified into a tropical storm a day later, gaining the international name Chaba. Around the same time, a new Low Pressure Area (LPA) east of Northern Luzon was given a Tropical Cyclone Formation Alert by JTWC, and was named by PAGASA as Domeng. The system eventually strengthened into a tropical storm where the JMA named the system Aere. Chaba continued to intensify until it reached Severe Tropical Storm status as Aere moved poleward and threatened the Japanese Ryukyu Islands. Chaba became a Category 1 typhoon and struck Maoming, China, and also sunk a crane ship passing nearby Hong Kong. Aere passed through Naha, Japan and weakened into a tropical depression. After crossing Japan, Aere (Domeng) was reupgraded by the Joint Typhoon Warning Center into a subtropical storm.

During the last week of July, Songda formed west of the Mariana Islands, which was joined by Trases (Ester) in the Philippine Sea three days later. Songda traveled northwestwards, passing over the waters of Kagoshima Prefecture on July 30. Songda dissipated on August 1 as its remnants made landfall over North Korea. Songda additionally brought heavy rainfall over Kyushu and Shikoku regions of Japan as well as Jeju Island in South Korea. Trases on the other hand passed over Okinawa, Trases made landfall on Jeju Island before weakening into a tropical depression until it dissipated on August 1.

In early August, a low pressure area formed southwest of Taiwan on August 1. Two days later, the disturbance strengthened into a tropical depression according to the JMA, and the JTWC designated the depression as Tropical Depression 08W. 08W dissipated on August 4, as it made landfall on Huidong County in Guangdong. On August 8, a tropical depression formed east of Vietnam. The JMA classified the system as a tropical storm and was given the name Mulan. The JTWC classified Mulan as a monsoon depression. Mulan travelled across the South China Sea and passed the Qiongzhou Strait before making landfall on Northern Vietnam and dissipating on August 11. On August 10, another low pressure area formed northwest of Iwo Jima. The JMA named the system as Meari as it reached tropical storm status. Meari made landfall near Shizuoka Prefecture before it transitioned into an extratropical cyclone by August 14. The storm disturbed multiple events held in Japan and caused some transportation in the country to be suspended. Additionally, causing minor damages to houses. On August 14, the JMA began tracking a weak tropical depression that formed west of the International Date Line. The depression only lasted until the next day. On August 19, the JMA began tracking a low pressure area north of Palau. The system was then named Ma-on by the JMA as it reached tropical storm status on August 22. The storm further strengthened into a severe tropical storm on the same day. Ma-on first made landfall over Maconacon in the province of Isabela before exiting the Philippine Area of Responsibility on August 24. Ma-on then made its second landfall near Yangjiang, China the next day and its final landfall in Northern Vietnam before it was last noted on August 26. Ma-on killed at seven people in the Philippines and Vietnam and caused moderate damages to infrastructures in both countries. On August 21 after Ma-on formed, another tropical depression formed northeast of Guam. Due to favoritable conditions, the depression rapidly intensified into a tropical storm and was named Tokage by the JMA. Three days later, the JTWC upgraded Tokage into a typhoon, with the JMA following suit 3 hours later. Tokage reached its peak intensity as a Category 3 before entering hostile environments east of Japan. Tokage became an extratropical storm on August 25 before it was last noted south of Alaska. Additionally, on August 22, a tropical depression formed north of Typhoon Tokage. However, it dissipated on the same day. Nearing the end of August on the 28th, a tropical depression formed southeast of Japan. The depression was named Hinnamnor by the JMA 6 hours later upon formation. Hinnamnor later strengthened into the basin's first Category 5-equivalent typhoon. Hinnamnor headed west towards the Ryuku Islands and stalled south of the prefecture while maintaining its strength. On August 30, another tropical depression formed south of intensifying Typhoon Hinnamnor. The depression was named Gardo by the PAGASA. Gardo was short lived and its structure was absorbed by Typhoon Hinnamnor near Taiwan. Hinnamnor later headed north in the East China Sea and restrengthened into a Category 3-equivalent typhoon. The typhoon then made landfall near Busan in South Korea and the JMA declared Hinnamnor as an extratropical low as it was located in the Sea of Japan. Hinnamnor killed at least 12 people and caused widespread damage across South Korea and Japan. Additionally, Hinnamnor's outer bands brought heavy rain across Taiwan and the Philippines causing moderate damage.

On September 5, a tropical depression formed near the Japanese island of Iwo-To. The JTWC designated the system as Invest 91W upon formation. The depression later intensified into a tropical storm and was named Muifa by the JMA. Muifa then intensified further into a Category 1 typhoon as it was located south of Okinawa. The typhoon reached its peak intensity as a Category 4 typhoon and passed the Yaeyama Islands on September 12 as it headed north very slowly while weakening. Muifa then slightly regained its strength in the East China Sea and made landfall near Shanghai in China two days later. The typhoon suspended several flights and port activities within the city. Muifa also became the strongest typhoon to strike Shanghai, beating the previous record set by Typhoon Gloria in 1949. Muifa then degenerated into a remnant low over the Chinese mainland until it was last noted on September 16. On September 9, a tropical depression formed west of Wake Island. The JTWC later designated the depression as 15W. It was then named Merbok as it strengthened into a tropical storm on September 12. Merbok then further intensified into a Category 1 typhoon before it headed north and transitioned into an extratropical cyclone by September 15. Merbok's remnants later brought gale force winds along Alaska. It then entered the Bering Sea, generating a dangerous storm surge which inundated several coastal villages and towns. Despite the impact, no injuries were reported. On September 11, the JMA began tracking a weak tropical depression which formed east of Iwo-To. The JTWC followed suit and designated the system as 16W on the next day. The depression later strengthened into a tropical storm and was named Nanmadol by the JMA. Nanmadol then intensified into a Category 1 typhoon on the same day. It further reached its peak intensity as a Category 4 typhoon as it approached Japan. The approaching typhoon prompted the JMA to issue a special warning which advised at least 4 million people to evacuate. Nanmadol then made landfall on the island of Kyushu. The typhoon then turned east before weakening further on September 19. Nanmadol killed at least 2 people and left more than 70 people injured. Additionally, the typhoon left more than 200,000 people without electricity.

After Nanmadol, the monsoon trough east of the Philippines set up, and a tropical disturbance embedded in it got upgraded by the Japan Meteorological Agency into a tropical depression. On the following day, the Joint Typhoon Warning Center designed the depression as 17W. Two days later, as it was approaching Japan, it intensified into a tropical storm, and was given the international name of Talas. However, soon after, Talas weakened back into a tropical depression and dissipated as it made its approach towards Southern Japan. Despite this short duration, Talas killed at least three people and caused a power outage across Japan's Shizuoka Prefecture. Another system in the monsoon trough formed in the Philippine Sea after Talas, and the JMA began tracking the system as a tropical depression. The depression was in a favorable environment for development and made the JTWC to classify the system as 18W on the next day. As the system formed within the Philippine Area of Responsibility (PAR), it was given the name Karding by the agency. On September 23, the depression intensified into a tropical storm, and was named Noru. After being initially sheared, Noru began a period of explosive intensification, developing a pinhole eye and intensifying briefly into a Category 5-equivalent super typhoon as it approached Luzon, Philippines. Noru however weakened due to increasing shear, and made its first landfall over the Polillo Islands in the municipality of Burdeos, Quezon. Shortly after, Noru rapidly weakened back into a Category 2-equivalent typhoon shortly before its second landfall over Dingalan, Aurora. Noru then entered the South China Sea where the typhoon re-intensified back into a Category 3-equivalent typhoon. Noru then re-developed a pinhole eye and reintensified into a Category 4 in the South China Sea, before getting sheared and striking Vietnam as a strong Category 2 before heading inland the Indochina Peninsula. Shortly after Noru's formation the JMA began tracking another tropical depression southeast of Japan. The depression was then named Kulap shortly after. Kulap gradually intensified in the open Pacific Ocean, becoming a typhoon as per the Joint Typhoon Warning Center by September 28. As the Philippines was still reeling from the effects of Super Typhoon Noru, PAGASA named Tropical Depression Luis in the Philippine Sea, with JTWC later designating Luis as 20W. Luis left the PAR shortly after without affecting the country. Outside the PAR, the storm began intensifying and was classified as a tropical storm which was then named Roke by the JMA. It quickly reached Category 1 strength and hours later on September 29, as a Category 2 typhoon. The intensification didn't last long and like Kulap, it didn't impact any areas. Roke eventually became an extratropical cyclone. However, Roke's remnants later developed into a subtropical storm.

On October 11, a depression named Maymay by the PAGASA, formed off the coast of the Philippines. Maymay was rather short lived and dissipated the next day. Despite the depression being short-lived, two people were killed from the storm and the storm caused infrastructure and agricultural damage. On the next day, another tropical depression classified as 21W formed east of the Mariana Islands. 21W was also short lived and never made landfall. On October 13, another tropical depression formed west of the Philippines in the South China Sea. The depression reached tropical storm status and was named Sonca by the JMA. Sonca made landfall in Quang Ngai Province, Vietnam and dissipated shortly after. 10 fatalities were reported in the region due to the heavy precipitation from the storm. On the same day Sonca formed, another tropical depression formed in the Philippine Sea. The storm was named Nesat on October 15, as the storm passed just north of the island of Luzon. Nesat then entered the South China Sea where it intensified further into a typhoon. Nesat reached its peak intensity as a Category 2 typhoon and began losing its strength as it approached Vietnam. Nesat dissipated on October 20, off the coast of Hainan Island. During its lifespan, Nesat caused minor damage across the Philippines, Taiwan, Vietnam, and Hong Kong. However, no fatalities were reported. On October 18, Tropical Storm Haitang formed after interacting with a non-tropical low and degenerating Tropical Depression 21W since October 14. Haitang was also short lived and became extratropical the next day. On the same day Haitang formed, another tropical depression formed south of Okinawa. The depression was classified as 25W as it headed west before it dissipated in the South China Sea without intensifying further. However, two reported deaths were reported from 25W in the Philippines. On October 26, a tropical depression formed in the Philippine Sea. As the system approached the Philippines, the JMA classified the low as a tropical storm where it named it Nalgae. Nalgae (Paeng) intensified into a severe tropical storm hours before striking the island of Catanduanes and the rest of the Bicol Region. Nalgae traveled across the Philippine archipelago, making 5 landfalls according to the PAGASA before emerging into the South China Sea where it further strengthened into a Category 1 typhoon, as per the Joint Typhoon Warning Center. As the typhoon approached the coast of China, Nalgae weakened back into a tropical storm due to hostile conditions and made landfall over Xiangzhou District, Zhuhai. Nalgae became the first tropical cyclone to make landfall over the country since Nepartak in 2003. Nalgae also caused heavy damage and flooding across the Philippines and killed at least 154 people in the country alone. On October 28, as Nalgae ravaged Southern Luzon, a tropical depression formed southeast of the Philippines, passing near Palau, with the PAGASA naming it as Queenie. On November 1, the JMA classified the system as a tropical storm and named it Banyan. Banyan however weakened back into a tropical depression the next day due to strong wind shear and dissipated before reaching the Philippines, only delivering some rainshowers as a remnant low. On November 11, a tropical depression formed near Wake Island. The JMA later named the system Yamaneko as it reached tropical storm status. Yamaneko was a short lived system and dissipated three days later. Yamaneko was an out to sea storm, harming no land area near it, and a relatively weak system in terms of intensity.

On December 9, a tropical depression formed east of the Philippines. The system continued to drift towards the Philippines and began to turn eastwards, where the system was named Pakhar by the JMA and Rosal by the PAGASA, as it reached tropical storm status. Pakhar's close approach to the Bicol Region and Polillo, Quezon prompted the PAGASA to raise Tropical Cyclone Warning Signal (TCWS) #1 in some areas in Southern Luzon. Pakhar killed 8 people indirectly from a flood that swept away a jeep in Rizal as it was making its close approach to the archipelago. Pakhar then intensified further, but later rapidly weakening and dissipating by December 12 from high vertical wind shear and dry air sent by the northeast monsoon, making its circulation exposed.

Systems

Tropical Depression 01W 

A tropical disturbance formed after crossing Palawan on late March. The disturburance then, developed into a low-pressure area southeast of Da Nang, Vietnam, where it developed into the first tropical depression of the season, at 18:00 UTC on March 29. At 21:00 UTC at the same day, the JTWC issued a Tropical Cyclone Formation Alert (TCFA) for the system after its development of a tropical depression. On the next day, the agency upgraded to a tropical depression, assigning it the designation 01W. Shortly after, the agency issued their final advisory on the system after it made landfall in the southeastern part of Vietnam on March 30, shortly after dissipating.

In Vietnam, floods caused by the storm have killed six people. The storm left one missing and eight injured. Flooding also caused two houses to collapse.

Typhoon Malakas (Basyang) 

The JTWC first noted the existence of a tropical disturbance on April 3. Favorable conditions near the system helped it develop, with the JMA recognizing the system as a tropical depression on April 6. Later in the day, the JTWC issued a TCFA for the system. The following day, the JTWC recognized the system as a tropical depression and gave it the designation 02W. At 21:00 UTC, the JTWC then upgraded it to a tropical storm. On April 8, the system developed into a tropical storm and was named Malakas by the JMA. Malakas continued traveling over the Pacific Ocean, and began to slowly intensify, becoming a severe tropical storm on the April 11, then a typhoon by April 12. At around the same time, it entered the Philippine Area of Responsibility (PAR), receiving the local name of Basyang from the PAGASA at 03:00 UTC. Malakas then lingered for a while at the border of the PAR before eventually exiting 5 hours later, while intensifying into a Category 2-equivalent typhoon. Malakas then continued its intensification, reaching Category 3-equivalent status later that day, and into a Category 4-equivalent typhoon on April 13, reaching its peak intensity. The following day, Malakas weakened to a Category 3-equivalent typhoon as its eye structure degraded. It further weakened to Category 1-equivalent status later in the day. By April 15, it began its transition into an extratropical cyclone, with its structure rapidly deteriorating. The JTWC gave their final warning on the system at 09:00 UTC of the same day, while the JMA did the same around 18:00 UTC.

Tropical Storm Megi (Agaton) 

Since the storm's conditions were favorable for development, the JMA included the storm in its weather summary as a tropical depression off the coast east of Visayas later that day. Around the same time, the PAGASA announced that the system had developed into a tropical depression, was named Agaton by the agency. The PAGASA began issuing Tropical Cyclone Bulletins (TCBs) for the storm later that day. On the next day, the JTWC later issued a TCFA for the system. At 03:00 UTC, the agency upgraded it to a tropical depression and assigned it the identifier 03W. On April 10, the JMA upgraded it to a tropical storm, assigning it the name Megi. It made its first landfall in Calicoan Island, Guiuan at 07:30 PHT (23:30 UTC). Megi then stalled in Leyte Gulf for hours before making its second landfall in Basey, Samar.
Megi then weakened into a tropical depression after lingering over the islands of Samar and Leyte, and the PAGASA removed all warning signals as it dissipated into a remnant low on the midnight of April 13.

From April 8 to April 10, the storm meandered along the Eastern Visayas region, dumping heavy rain on the region. The PAGASA raised storm signals up to Signal No. 2 during the storm's onslaught. Cebu City was placed under a state of calamity following the heavy rain. Megi killed 214 people which made it the deadliest April tropical cyclone on record in the Philippines, injured eight people and left 134 people missing, and capsized a cargo boat in Ormoc following strong rains, winds, and flash floods that also displaced over 136,390 individuals. The Department of Agriculture estimated agricultural damage to reach ₱3.27 billion, while the Department of Public Works and Highways estimated infrastructural damage at ₱1.45 billion. Total damage from the storm is thus valued at ₱4.72 billion (US$90.8 million).

Typhoon Chaba (Caloy) 

A low-pressure area west of Luzon developed into a tropical depression on June 28. At 20:00 PHT (12:00 UTC), the PAGASA had recognized the storm's development into a tropical depression, began issuing advisories, and named the system Caloy. The following day, the JTWC issued a TCFA for the system. Caloy remained almost stationary in the South China Sea before slowly moving northwestwards, eventually leaving the Philippine Area of Responsibility by 15:00 UTC. As the PAGASA issued its last bulletin on the tropical depression, the JTWC began issuing warnings for the storm and was given the designation 04W. Later, the Japan Meteorological Agency upgraded Caloy into a tropical storm, naming it Chaba. Chaba continued to intensify in the South China Sea, later being upgraded into a severe tropical storm east of Hainan. Typhoon Chaba's outer rainbands produced at least three tornadoes, which impacted Shantou, Chaozhou, and Foshan. On July 1 at 21:00 UTC, the JTWC upgraded Chaba to a typhoon, with the JMA doing the same 3 hours later on July 2 at 0:00 UTC. Later that day at 07:00 UTC, it made landfall on Maoming. Shortly after its landfall, both the JMA and the JTWC assessed that Chaba lost typhoon status, downgrading Chaba to a severe tropical storm and to a tropical storm respectively. The JTWC then issued their final warning on Chaba at 15:00 UTC. Shortly after, the JMA downgraded Chaba to a tropical storm; it was further downgraded to a tropical depression on July 3 at 06:00 UTC.

 southwest of Hong Kong, the Fujing 001, a crane vessel tasked in assisting with the construction of an offshore wind farm, split in half and quickly sunk—leaving 26 crew members missing. Three of the 30 crew members were rescued, seen in a video published online by the Hong Kong Government Flying Service. Another person was rescued by July 4, bringing the total number of people rescued to four. Twelve bodies from the ship were recovered. More than 400 flights were suspended in Hainan; one person was injured in Macau.

Tropical Storm Aere (Domeng) 

At 14:00 PHT (06:00 UTC), the PAGASA recognized the disturbance's formation into a tropical depression, began issuing tropical cyclone bulletins, and named the system Domeng. The JMA recognized the storm as a tropical depression at 12:00 UTC on the same day; the JTWC followed shortly after. On the next day, the Japan Meteorological Agency upgraded Domeng into a tropical storm and named it Aere as it was east of Batanes. Aere then continued to track north and at 03:00 UTC on July 2, Aere left the Philippine Area of Responsibility; the PAGASA released its final bulletin on the storm shortly after. Later that day, Aere made landfall over Okinawa. On July 3 at 09:00 UTC, the JTWC downgraded Aere to a tropical depression. However, three days later, the JTWC released another unofficial bulletin, reclassifying this disturbance as a subtropical storm, with an estimated pressure of 1000 hPa.

Tropical Storm Songda 

On July 26, a low-pressure area northwest of the Mariana Islands developed into a tropical depression. The system tracked northwest along the periphery of a subtropical high, with limited intensification. After some development while over the Philippine Sea on July 28, the JMA upgraded the system to a tropical storm, giving it the name Songda. The JTWC recognized the system's formation into a tropical depression on July 29, three days after the JMA. Songda continued tracking northwestwards, passing over the waters of Kagoshima Prefecture on July 30, slowing down over the Yellow Sea. It then recurved towards mainland Korea, losing its strength as it entered unfavorable conditions which sheared its center. Songda dissipated on August 1; its remnants made landfall over North Korea on August 2.

Songda caused heavy rainfall over the Kyushu and Shikoku regions of Japan and over Jeju Island in South Korea. Despite strong winds and around 206 millimeters of rain, no damages were reported on Jeju Island.

Tropical Storm Trases (Ester) 

A low-pressure area from a massive monsoon gyre developed into a tropical depression southeast of the Ryukyu Islands on July 29. The PAGASA followed suit in upgrading it, then named the system Ester. Trases moved generally northward over the Philippine Sea, maintaining its strength as it did so. Trases exited the Philippine Area of Responsibility at 05:00 PHT (21:00 UTC) on July 31; the PAGASA issued their last bulletin on the storm at 11:00 PHT (03:00 UTC). As Trases neared the Okinawa Islands, the JMA upgraded it into a tropical storm, and it was given the name Trases.

Trases then passed over Okinawa, and later made landfall in Jeju Island. The JTWC issued a TCFA. Later, they upgraded Trases into a tropical depression, and gave the designation of 07W. Trases then interacted with the nearby Tropical Depression Songda, and made a second landfall on the mainland of South Korea on August 1. Not long after, the JMA downgraded Trases into a tropical depression, and the JTWC issued their last advisory on it as it lingered near the western coast of South Korea.

Tropical Depression 08W 

Under a favorable environment of warm sea surface temperatures, low wind shear, and moderate equatorial outflow, the convection rapidly consolidated a low-level circulation center which led the JTWC to issue a Tropical Cyclone Formation Alert by the next day. The JMA then upgraded the system into a tropical depression by 18:00 UTC the same day. The JTWC subsequently followed suit, designating the depression as 08W by early August 4. The system then struck Huidong County, Guangdong at 01:40 UTC that same day, according to the China Meteorological Administration, prompting the JTWC to issue its final advisory eight hours after landfall.

Tropical Storm Mulan 

The system then subsequently moved over Luzon and emerged into the South China Sea, where it organized but its circulation remained broad, having two distinct vortices present in satellite imagery. The JMA then upgraded the system into a tropical depression by 00:00 UTC on August 8. The JTWC designated the system as a "monsoon depression" six hours later due to many centers present in the system, before issuing a TCFA as it was steadily organizing with its radius of maximum winds shrinking. By the next day, the JMA upgraded it into a tropical storm, and it was given the name Mulan. The JTWC, however, did not recognize Mulan as tropical, due to its huge radius of maximum winds which "are typically present in monsoonal depressions." The storm did not intensify further, according to the JMA, and by 02:50 UTC on August 10, Mulan made landfall on the coastal areas of Xuwen County in Zhanjiang, Guangdong. The JTWC subsequently canceled the TCFA and downgraded its formation chances to medium. The JMA then downgraded the storm into a tropical depression as it moved inland in Vietnam by the next day, and was last noted six hours later the same day.

Heavy rainfall in Vietnam caused flash flooding which resulted in the deaths of six people. The storm also caused agricultural damages of an estimated ₫2.5 billion (US$107,000) after about 30,000 lobsters have died due to the effects of the storm. In Son La the damaged reached 7 billion dong (US$295,000), in Da Bac District is 2.3 billion dong (US$97,000) and in Cao Phong District in Hoa Binh is 3 billion dong (US$127,000).

Tropical Storm Meari 

A low-pressure area developed into a tropical depression northwest of Iwo Jima on August 10. After JMA named the system Meari, the JTWC followed suit in an unofficial bulletin, classifying this system as a tropical storm. However, according to the agency, because of colder waters, the storm returned to the Pacific Ocean after threatening the southern coast of Japan without causing major impacts.

In preparation for Meari, government officials in Tokyo warned of heavy rains and strong winds. The final day of the Rock in Japan Festival was cancelled and ticket refunds were distributed. Three J1 League games in Tokyo and Kanagawa Prefecture were also cancelled. About 72,000 residents were evacuated in Shizuoka; two landslides were reported which isolated five houses. Power outages affected 1,200 homes in Shimizu and another 2,200 were affected in Kakegawa. Parts of the Shin-Tōmei Expressway, connecting Tokyo to Nagoya, were closed as a result of heavy rains, while tunnel speed limits were lowered. Rainfall also affected flights and bullet train services, the latter of which affecting 92,000 people. An elderly man in Hamamatsu sustained forehead injuries after being knocked down by strong winds.

Homes in Central Japan were destroyed.

Severe Tropical Storm Ma-on (Florita) 

The low pressure area slowly moved westwards, eventually developing into a tropical depression on August 20. The following day, the PAGASA also announced the system's formation into a tropical depression, and as a result of its position within the PAR, assigned it the name Florita. Shortly afterwards, the JTWC designated the system as 10W. Florita remained relatively weak, having an exposed circulation. By August 22, it was upgraded to tropical storm, being designated Ma-on by the Japan Meteorological Agency, with the JTWC later following suit.

On the evening of August 22, the exposed low-level circulation center was obscured by a convection burst, which later turned into a central dense overcast, which prompted the JMA to upgrade Ma-on into a severe tropical storm. At 10 a.m. PHT, Ma-on made landfall at Maconacon, Isabela as a high-end severe tropical storm, just short of typhoon intensity, according to the PAGASA. Four fatalities occurred; infrastructural damage was at an estimated ₱499 million (US$8.88 million). Damage in the agricultural sector was at around ₱14.3 million (US$253,800).

On the morning of August 25, Ma-on made landfall in Guangdong, China. Shortly after, the system moved westward to the Gulf of Tonkin. Later, the storm made its final landfall in Móng Cái, Quảng Ninh Province in Vietnam.

The storm caused moderate damage in Vietnam and killed three people.

Typhoon Tokage 

On August 21, the JMA noted that a tropical depression had formed to the northeast of Guam. Under a favorable environment of warm sea surface temperatures, low wind shear, and very good poleward outflow, the system rapidly intensified to become Tropical Storm Tokage by early next day. Moving north-northwest, Tokage would intensify into a severe tropical storm later by the same day, and by 09:00 UTC on August 23, the JTWC upgraded Tokage to a typhoon, with the JMA following suit three hours later. After peaking, Tokage rapidly weakened under high wind shear as it curved northeastwards due to a deep-layered subtropical ridge positioned to the east of the storm, and commenced extratropical transition by 03:00 UTC on August 25. The storm would complete its transition 12 hours later, with the JTWC issuing its final advisory, and the JMA following suit three hours later.

Typhoon Hinnamnor (Henry) 

On August 27, the JTWC began monitoring a disturbance located 461 nautical miles off Iwo Jima, which they labeled Invest 90W. Following organization, the agency issued a Tropical Cyclone Formation Alert (TCFA) at 04:10 UTC the next day. 6 hours later, it intensified into a tropical storm, being named Hinnamnor by the JMA. At the same time, the JMA upgraded Hinnamnor to a typhoon. The system underwent rapid intensification, and proceeded to gain Category 3-equivalent winds at 12:00 UTC the same day. Hinnamnor then weakened following an eyewall replacement cycle, slowing down as it neared Okinawa. As it stalled south of the Prefecture, the storm re-intensified, with an intense central dense overcast forming along with a larger eye.
On August 31, at 5:30 p.m. PHT (09:30 UTC), Hinnamnor entered the PAGASA's Philippine Area of Responsibility and was named Henry.

In Ifugao, a man was buried in the landslide due to heavy rains caused by the typhoon. Several flights were canceled to and from Okinawa. When the typhoon made landfall in South Korea, it brought severe impacts. 60,000 homes were left without electricity and an elderly woman died due to currents. Another 9 people are missing. In the city of Pohang, South Korea, seven people were killed in the flooding of an underground parking garage. Hinnamnor caused >$1 billion in damages.

Tropical Depression 13W (Gardo) 

On August 30 at 00:00 UTC, the JMA began tracking a westward-moving tropical depression. A few hours later, the PAGASA gave it the local name Gardo due to it being inside their area of responsibility. The JTWC issued a TCFA for the system, and would then upgrade the system to a tropical depression, designating it as 13W. Due to its proximity to Typhoon Hinnamnor, its outflow fully exposed 13W's circulation. On September 1, the JMA, the JTWC, and the PAGASA issued their final warnings on the system as it was absorbed into Hinnamnor.

Typhoon Muifa (Inday) 

According to the agency, the cyclone achieved a favorable environment for a more comprehensive intensification because of the warm waters (between ) and was designated as Invest 91W. A day later, the cyclone became a tropical storm according to the JTWC, being  SSE of Kadena Air Base. The JMA, however, had not released any bulletin to designate this system until then. When the storm entered PAGASA's area of responsibility, it was named Inday; in its first bulletin, the agency stated that the storm was unlikely to impact the Philippines. Within the PAR, the storm strengthened into a severe tropical storm according to PAGASA. Muifa then intensified into a typhoon according to the JTWC, as it reached  in sustained one-minute winds. Muifa continued intensifying, with the JTWC then assessing that Muifa reached Category 3-equivalent status on September 10. Then strengthening a bit more to a Category 4-equivalent typhoon. On September 12, Muifa hit Ishigaki Island; it left the PAR the same day in the afternoon. It is the most powerful typhoon to strike Shanghai on record. Muifa was downgraded to a tropical storm when it made landfall according to the JTWC. Muifa was downgraded to a tropical depression again by the JTWC on its last bulletin for the system.

On September 13, China issued an orange alert (Signal #2) on Muifa, warning that it could impact the Taiwan Strait, in addition to the provinces of Jiangsu, northern Zhejiang, and Shanghai. Several flights departing from the airports in Zhoushan, Ningbo and Shanghai were suspended due to Muifa. Activities in the Port of Shanghai were also suspended.

Typhoon Merbok 

On 00:00 UTC of September 9, the JMA began tracking a weak tropical depression that had developed west of Wake Island. The JMA downgraded the system to a low-pressure area shortly thereafter. However, on the next day, the JMA re-upgraded the system to a tropical depression. The JTWC followed suit and began issuing advisories, assigning it the designation 15W. In its fifth bulletin, the JTWC stated that 15W turned into a tropical storm when it reached  one-minute sustained winds. Later that day, Merbok reached severe tropical storm status. On September 15, the JTWC gave its final bulletin on Merbok, noting that it had moved away from habitable areas.

After transitioning into an extratropical cyclone, the system tracked generally northeastward and continued to deepen as it approached the western Aleutian Islands. The storm track generated a large dynamic fetch across the Bering Sea, which contributed to a dangerous storm surge that inundated several coastal villages and towns in western Alaska. Governor Mike Dunleavy declared a state of emergency in the region before the cyclone hit. Significant flooding and gale force winds were also reported in Golovin, Nome, Shaktoolik and Kotlik. Despite the widespread coastal flooding, no injuries were reported.

Typhoon Nanmadol (Josie) 

On 06:00 UTC of September 9, the JMA briefly tracked a weak tropical depression to the east of Iwo To, Japan. The JMA re-upgraded the system to a tropical depression two days later. On the same day, the JMA and the JTWC upgraded the system to a tropical storm, with the JMA assigning it the name Nanmadol. The storm then reached typhoon status on September 15. Nanmadol rapidly intensified into a very strong typhoon, according to the JTWC's thirteenth bulletin. Nanmadol then entered the PAGASA's Philippine Area of Responsibility at 09:40 UTC on September 16, and was given the name Josie, however, it quickly left the PAR, just over four hours later, at 14:00 UTC on the same day. A system pressure of 910 hPa (mbar) was then recorded, the lowest so far this season. When it made landfall in southern Japan, the typhoon was downgraded to Category 3-equivalent status upon reaching Kyushu Islands. Upon directly impacting the country, it was downgraded again to Category 1-equivalent status. On its way to northeast Japan post-landfall, the cyclone was downgraded to a tropical storm by the JTWC. The JMA also followed suit and downgraded it to a severe tropical storm. In its twenty-ninth bulletin, the JTWC reported that Nanmadol was weakening as it moved over land in Japan and would be downgraded to an extratropical cyclone.

Before the cyclone hit the country, the JMA issued a special warning that Nanmadol could cause severe damage, and at least 4 million people have been advised to leave their homes. Exceptionally high volumes of precipitation were recorded and resulted in flooding in streets, destruction of building walls. and destroyed power poles. At least 2 people died and another 70 people were injured. More than 200,000 people were left without electricity. In South Korea, the winds and rain caused by the typhoon also caused inconvenience. One person was injured, more than 700 people were evacuated from their homes, fallen trees were reported, and some locations in the southeast portion of the country were left without electricity.

Tropical Storm Talas 

On September 20, a disturbance turned into a tropical depression according to the JMA. The JTWC reported that the low pressure encountered favorable environments for intensification by warm waters and low wind shear. The next day, the JTWC designated the system as 17W as it was upgraded into a tropical depression. On September 23, the cyclone was upgraded to a tropical storm according to the JTWC's sixth bulletin. The storm was named Talas by the JMA. When it made landfall in southern Japan, it was downgraded to a tropical depression according to the seventh JTWC bulletin.

A 10 to 12 centimeters total hourly, total 30 to 42 centimeters in twelve hours precipitation hit in Hamamatsu, Shizuoka City and other areas of Shizuoka Prefecture. A landslide hit Ōigawa Railway in Kawane, two transmission towers collapsed in Aoi-ku, Shizuoka, and 119,200 customers were affected by power outages in Shizuoka Prefecture, according to Heita Kawakatsu, Governor of Shizuoka. According to the Japan Fire and Disaster Management Agency official report, Talas killed three people and injured six others.

Typhoon Noru (Karding) 

On September 21, a disturbance developed into tropical depression near the Philippines, according to the JMA. The JTWC designated this disturbance as Invest 95W and issued a bulletin noting that the low pressure system could have reasonable intensification due to low wind shear and warmer water. Hours later, the JTWC upgraded the system into a tropical depression, designating it as 18W. The PAGASA then followed suit on 00:00 UTC of September 22, and the tropical depression was assigned the name Karding. A few hours later, the system reached tropical storm intensity and the JMA assigned it the name Noru. The PAGASA raised TCWS #1 at 21:00 UTC on September 23, with TCWS #3 being raised a day later as the storm rapidly intensified into a typhoon. On 24 September, Noru entered the Philippine area of responsibility and reached typhoon intensity. PAGASA raised signal No. 4 on the same day, informing that the north of Luzon could be severely impacted by the cyclone. At 00:00 UTC on September 25, the JTWC classified Karding as a Category 5-equivalent super typhoon. PAGASA then followed and upgraded Noru to a super typhoon. At 5:30 p.m. Philippine Standard Time, according to the PAGASA, Noru struck Burdeos, Polillo Islands, Quezon Province. When it made landfall in the northern Philippines, the cyclone was downgraded to Category 4 according to the JTWC. At 8:20pm PHT, Noru struck Dingalan in the province of Aurora as a typhoon according to PAGASA. The terrain of the Sierra Madre mountain range weakened Noru as it passed through Central Luzon.

Noru then slightly re-intensified in the West Philippine Sea, leaving the PAGASA's area of responsibility on Monday morning.

The National Disaster Risk Reduction and Management Council (NDRRMC) of the Philippines reported at least ₱304 million (US$6.18 million) in infrastructural damages and ₱3.08 billion (US$62.5 million) in agricultural damages, totalling to ₱3.38 billion (US$68.7 million). 40 people have been reported dead following the typhoon, another 5 remain missing.

Severe Tropical Storm Kulap 

On September 24, the JTWC released a first report on a low pressure system and because it entered warmer waters and low wind shear, the agency named it Invest 96W. The next day, JMA classified the system as a tropical depression. Hours later, the JTWC followed suit, and designated him 19W.
The next day, the cyclone intensified and the JTWC in its second bulletin, classified it as a "tropical storm". The JMA followed suit and called it Kulap. The JMA quickly classified it as a "severe tropical storm" but the JTWC went further and upgraded it to a Category 1 typhoon. Upon threatening the Japanese coast, the cyclone continued its course until it was downgraded to a tropical storm, according to bulletins released by the two agencies. By moving to cooler areas and without threatening any habitable areas, the system transitioned into an extratropical cyclone, prompting the agencies to issue their final advisories on the system.

Typhoon Roke (Luis) 

On September 27, the JMA began to monitor a weak tropical depression that had developed in the Philippine Sea and had been designated as Invest 98W by the JTWC. The agency said in a TCFA bulletin that because it was in warmer waters and low shear, there was scope for broader intensification. The prediction was confirmed, and a few hours later, it was classified as a tropical depression, being called 20W. The following day, the storm entered the PAGASA's area of responsibility and was called Luis, but it did not directly threaten the Philippines and left the PAGASA's area of responsibility a few hours later. Subsequently, the cyclone gained strength and reached a "tropical storm" according to the second JTWC bulletin. The JMA named the system Roke. Two days later, the JTWC and JMA classified it as a Category 1 typhoon, The intensification did not last long and Roke was downgraded to a tropical storm. Having the same fate as its predecessor Kulap, the JTWC released a final bulletin in which Roke had been downgraded to an extratropical cyclone. However, the cyclone intensified into a subtropical storm according to the JTWC's special bulletin. On October 1, it weakened into a subtropical depression.

Tropical Depression Maymay 

Under a favorable environment of warm sea surface temperatures, low to moderate wind shear, and strong poleward outflow, the system continued to organize before PAGASA upgraded it as a tropical depression, naming it as Maymay, late on October 10. The JMA subsequently followed suit by the next day. Later that same day, the JTWC issued a TCFA on Maymay, noting that the storm's center was tucked beneath the southeast side of an intense but disorganized convection. However, the storm's convective structure was detached from the main center due to a TUTT cell to the northeast of it, which made the storm weaken as it moved northwestwards, prompting the JMA to downgrade Maymay into a low-pressure area on October 12. The PAGASA subsequently followed suit late on the same day, and JTWC cancelled their TCFA by October 13.

Though short-lived, Maymay killed two people in Cagayan, Philippines. The Provincial Disaster Risk Reduction Management Office (PDDRMO) in Cagayan estimated infrastructure and agricultural damage at ₱533 million (US$9.16 million) and 33,432 individuals were impacted by Maymay.

Tropical Depression 21W 

Within a favorable environment of low wind shear, warm sea surface temperatures, and fair equatorial outflow, the agency would later issue a TCFA for the system four hours later, and initiate advisories on Tropical Depression 21W at 15:00 UTC the same day, noting the convection of the system became compact and symmetrical, and was displaced slightly from the center. The JMA followed suit three hours later. The system soon became severely sheared by the next day as wind shear increased dramatically while it continued moving eastward, before it got embedded into a convergent outer boundary of a deep TUTT cell positioned towards the northwest, helping the storm re-organize and intensify into a tropical storm by October 14. The storm, however, accelerated north-northeastwards at that point, as it got embedded under strong southerly flow within the eastern periphery of a broad subtropical upper-level low that would later become Tropical Storm Haitang, and it soon opened up into a tropical wave later the same day.

Tropical Storm Sonca 

Within a marginally favorable environment of no distinct outflow established, low to moderate wind shear, and warm sea surface temperatures, the system slightly organized by the next day, with flaring convection and its center remaining exposed. Nonetheless, the JMA upgraded the system into a tropical depression on October 13. The JTWC later issued a TCFA on the system on the same day, noting fragmented deep convection was wrapping into its broad low-level center. By the next day, the JTWC initiated advisories on the storm, designating it as 22W. Moving westward, the storm intensified into a tropical storm six hours later, with the JMA naming it as Sonca. Sonca failed to intensify further as its center remained exposed, with deep convection displaced to the west due to strong wind shear, and it soon made landfall on Da Nang, Vietnam late on the same day, prompting the JTWC to issue their final advisory on the system. The JMA followed suit by October 15, as Sonca weakened into a tropical depression.
 
Initial estimated economic losses in Da Nang City caused by Sonca's heavy precipitation are around 1.48 trillion VND (US$60.8 million). Infrastructure losses in Thừa Thiên Huế province reached 337 billion VND (US$13.5 million). 2 people were killed and 4 injured in the province.

Typhoon Nesat (Neneng) 

Nesat formed from an area of disturbed weather east of the Philippines, and on October 13, entered the PAGASA's Philippine Area of Responsibility and was named Neneng by the agency. Neneng continued to intensify in the Philippine Sea and was given the international name of Nesat by the Japan Meteorological Agency. On October 16, at 3:50 a.m. Philippine Standard Time, the PAGASA noted that Nesat (Neneng) made its first landfall in the island of Calayan in the province of Cagayan as a severe tropical storm. According to the PAGASA, Nesat underwent "extreme" rapid intensification and became a typhoon after it passed through the Luzon Strait. A day after, Nesat exited the PAR, and the PAGASA stopped issuing advisories on the system.

Flooding in northern Luzon caused damage to buildings and infrastructure. According to NDRRMC, 103,662 people were impacted when Nesat moved through, with 4,459 displaced; there were no fatalities. A final report by PDRRMO estimated infrastructure and agricultural damage at ₱474.2 million (US$8.15 million).

Tropical Storm Haitang 

Since October 14, a non-tropical low with subtropical characteristics started to persist north of Minamitorishima and northwest of then-degenerating Tropical Depression 21W. The low remained stationary, slowly weakened and acquired more tropical characteristics next three days, and JTWC eventually declared a tropical depression early on October 18 when the system had been deepening again and became compact. Although the JMA reported a gale-force non-tropical low at the same time, the system was soon analyzed as a tropical storm and named Haitang. The center of the storm soon became weakly-defined as extensive dry air entrained the storm, prompting the JTWC to downgrade the storm into a tropical depression and issue their final advisory late on the same day. The JMA, however, continued to issue advisories on the storm as it moved northeastwards, and transitioned into an extratropical cyclone on October 19.

Tropical Depression 25W (Obet) 

A tropical depression formed northeast of the Philippines on October 18, given the name Obet by PAGASA. The following day, the JTWC upgraded it to a tropical depression, designating it 25W. It was initially expected to be a tropical storm, but never intensified as expected. According to Municipal Disaster Risk Reduction & Management Office (MDRRMO), two deaths, a fisherman and his wife, were reported due to 25W.

Severe Tropical Storm Nalgae (Paeng) 

On October 26, the JTWC reported in its TCFA (Tropical Cyclone Formation Alert) that a low pressure area near the Philippines was able to develop because of warm waters and low wind shear.  The agency designated it as Invest 93W. The JMA and the PAGASA then classified the disturbance as a tropical depression, with the latter assigning the name Paeng to the system. The JTWC upgraded the system to a tropical depression a day later, at 00:00 UTC on October 27, and it was given the designation 26W. At the same time, the JMA upgraded the typhoon to a tropical storm, and was named Nalgae. The following day, PAGASA and JTWC classified it as a severe tropical storm approaching the northeast of the Philippines. PAGASA issued danger alerts (Signal No. 3), informing that damage could be registered as Paeng approached the archipelago. On 17:10 UTC on October 28, Nalgae made its first landfall at Virac, Catanduanes, followed by another landfall at Caramoan, Camarines Sur just thirty minutes later. It crossed the Bicol Region and exited into the Sibuyan Sea, and later made its third landfall in Buenavista, Quezon, maintaining its strength as it did so. Nalgae then headed southwestward and struck Mogpog in the island province of Marinduque, then later crossed the Sibuyan Sea again and made its fifth landfall in Sariaya, once again in the province of Quezon, later passing into Laguna. Nalgae then passed through Metro Manila and Rizal, heading into Bulacan by evening of October 29. By the next day, Nalgae weakened into a tropical storm in the West Philippine Sea, but re-intensified into a severe tropical storm a few hours later, and exited the Philippine Area of Responsibility a day later. Upon its exit from Philippine jurisdiction, Nalgae then intensified into a Category 1-equivalent typhoon on JTWC; however, the JMA maintained its severe tropical storm classification for the system. It then approached the Pearl River Delta, prompting officials in Hong Kong and Macau to raise Signal No. 8 from November 1 to 2. At around 04:50 CST on November 3, 2022, Nalgae made its final landfall at Xiangzhou District, Zhuhai as a tropical depression, making it the first tropical cyclone since Nepartak in 2003 to make landfall in China in November.

Tropical Storm Banyan (Queenie) 

On October 29, the JTWC released a first TCFA, reporting that a tropical disturbance, designated as Invest 94W, had formed far from the Philippine Sea. However, hours later, the agency canceled the TCFA over this low-pressure area after it had lost strength. However, the agency released a second TCFA, reporting that the disturbance had re-intensified, and classified the possibility of tropical depression as "high". The JMA went further in a bulletin, and already classified it as a depression. At 21:00 UTC on October 30, the tropical depression was designated 27W. Upon entering the Philippine Area of Responsibility, it was given the local name Queenie by PAGASA. Queenie intensified into a tropical storm, and was given the international name Banyan by the Japan Meteorological Agency. Banyan then weakened due to strong wind shear, and was downgraded into a tropical depression by the next day. Later that afternoon, the PAGASA had issued their final advisory on Banyan after it dissipated into a remnant low pressure area. The remnants of Banyan continued to cause some rain in eastern Mindanao.

Tropical Storm Yamaneko 

A tropical depression formed east-northeast of Wake Island on November 11. The system then strengthened to a tropical storm, gaining the name Yamaneko from the JMA. The system was short-lived and weakened due to cooler sea temperatures. The system dissipated on the morning of November 14.

Tropical Storm Pakhar (Rosal) 

An area of low pressure formed east of Mindanao within the Philippine Sea which would later be designated as an invest which would move generally northwest towards the island of Samar and east of the Visayas region. On December 9, the Low Pressure Area (LPA) was upgraded into a Tropical Depression by the Japan Meteorological Agency and be designated as 29W by the JTWC later on. As it was inside the Philippine Area of Responsibility, it was assigned the name Rosal after it was designated as a tropical depression by the Philippine Atmospheric Geophysical Astronomical Services Administration (PAGASA). Rosal's close approach to the archipelago would then prompt the raising of tropical cyclone warning signals across some parts of Bicol Region. The storm would later intensify into a tropical storm and be named "Pakhar"  by the JMA. By the morning of December 12, Pakhar reached its peak intensity east of the Babuyan Islands and later weaken rapidly by wind shear in the Philippine Sea east of Extreme Northern Luzon. During the early morning hours of December 13, PAGASA would downgrade Pakhar to a remnant low east of northeastern Cagayan, dissipating due to dry air from the northeast monsoon surge, which tore apart Pakhar's circulation.

Pakhar's trough resulted in heavy rain, which indirectly resulted in 8 deaths in the province of Tanay, Rizal after a jeep was swept away by flash flooding.

Other systems 
A low-pressure area developed into a tropical depression to the northeast of Mindanao early on May 30, but quickly dissipated near Mindanao late on the same day.

On July 22, the JMA began tracking a low pressure area off south of Japan. On July 24, the JMA upgraded the system to a tropical depression.

The JMA started to monitor a weak tropical depression that formed just west of the International Date Line  on August 14. The system only persisted until early on the next day.

A tropical depression formed far east of Japan on August 22, and dissipated the same day.

On September 25, the JMA tracked a weak tropical depression a few hundred miles off the Japanese coast, but it dissipated on the same day. 

On November 15, a low-pressure area and an intertropical convergence zone brought flooding and heavy rain to the Philippines due to the combined effects of  the weather systems. Landslides were said to have occurred in some parts of the Philippines. By November 18, extreme flooding was experienced in some parts of Mindanao. The Philippine Red Cross served hot meals to 1,691 displaced people due to the effects of the flood. Localities in Cotabato have also suspended classes. At least five casualties had occurred.

Storm names 

Within the Northwest Pacific Ocean, both the Japan Meteorological Agency (JMA) and the Philippine Atmospheric, Geophysical and Astronomical Services Administration (PAGASA) assign names to tropical cyclones that develop in the Western Pacific, which can result in a tropical cyclone having two names. PAGASA names to tropical cyclones which move into or form as a tropical depression in their area of responsibility located between 135°E and 115°E and between 5°N and 25°N even if the cyclone has had an international name assigned to it. The names of significant tropical cyclones will be retired by both PAGASA and the Typhoon Committee in the spring of 2023.

International names

The JMA selected the names from a list of 140 names, that had been developed by the 14 members nations and territories of the ESCAP/WMO Typhoon Committee. During the season, the names Trases, Mulan, Hinnamnor, and Yamaneko were used for the first time after they replaced the names Sarika, Haima, Nock-ten, and Hato which were retired after the 2016 and 2017 seasons. During the season, 25 names on the naming list that listed here were used along with their international numeric designation.

Philippines

During the season, PAGASA used its own naming scheme for the 18 tropical cyclones, that either developed within or moved into their self-defined area of responsibility. The names were taken from a list of names, that was last used during 2018 and are scheduled to be used again during 2026. All of the names are the same except Obet, Rosal and Umberto which replaced the names Ompong, Rosita and Usman after they were retired. The names Obet and Rosal were used for the first time this year.

Season effects
This table summarizes all the systems that developed within or moved into the North Pacific Ocean, to the west of the International Date Line during 2022. The tables also provide an overview of a system's intensity, duration, land areas affected, and any deaths or damages associated with the system.

|-
| 01W ||  || bgcolor=#| || bgcolor=#| || bgcolor=#||| Vietnam ||  Minimal ||  || 
|-
| Malakas (Basyang) ||  || bgcolor=#| || bgcolor=#| || bgcolor=#||| Guam, Caroline Islands, Bonin Islands ||  None ||  None ||
|-
| Megi (Agaton) ||  || bgcolor=#| || bgcolor=#| || bgcolor=#||| Philippines ||  ||  || 
|-
| TD ||  || bgcolor=#| || bgcolor=#| || bgcolor=#||| Philippines ||  None ||  None || 
|-
| Chaba (Caloy) ||  || bgcolor=#| || bgcolor=#| || bgcolor=#||| China, Vietnam ||  ||  || 
|-
| Aere (Domeng) ||  || bgcolor=#| || bgcolor=#| || bgcolor=#||| Japan ||  Unknown ||  None || 
|-
| TD ||  || bgcolor=#| || bgcolor=#|  || bgcolor=#||| None ||  None ||  None || 
|-
| Songda ||  || bgcolor=#| || bgcolor=#|  || bgcolor=#||| Japan, South Korea, North Korea ||  None ||  None || 
|-
| Trases (Ester) ||  || bgcolor=#| || bgcolor=#|  || bgcolor=#||| Ryukyu Islands, South Korea ||  None ||  None || 
|-
| 08W ||  || bgcolor=#| || bgcolor=#| || bgcolor=#||| South China, Vietnam ||  Unknown ||  None || 
|-
| Mulan ||  || bgcolor=#| || bgcolor=#| || bgcolor=#||| South China, Vietnam, Laos, Thailand, Myanmar ||  ||  || 
|-
| Meari ||  || bgcolor=#| || bgcolor=#| || bgcolor=#||| Japan ||  Unknown ||  None || 
|-
| TD ||  || bgcolor=#| || bgcolor=#| || bgcolor=#||| None ||  None ||  None || 
|-
| Ma-on (Florita) ||  || bgcolor=#| || bgcolor=#| || bgcolor=#||| Philippines, South China, Vietnam ||  ||  || 
|-
| Tokage ||  || bgcolor=#| || bgcolor=#| || bgcolor=#||| None ||  None ||  None || 
|-
| TD ||  || bgcolor=#| || bgcolor=#|  || bgcolor=#||| None ||  None ||  None || 
|-
| Hinnamnor (Henry) ||  || bgcolor=#| || bgcolor=#|  || bgcolor=#||| Japan, Philippines, Taiwan, East China, South Korea, North Korea, Russian Far East ||  ||  || 
|-
| 13W (Gardo) ||  || bgcolor=#| || bgcolor=#|  || bgcolor=#||| None ||  None ||  None || 
|-
| Muifa (Inday) ||  || bgcolor=#| || bgcolor=#|  || bgcolor=#||| Philippines, Taiwan, Yaeyama Islands, East China ||  ||  3 || 
|-
| Merbok ||  || bgcolor=#| || bgcolor=#|  || bgcolor=#||| None ||  None ||  None || 
|-
| Nanmadol (Josie) ||  || bgcolor=#| || bgcolor=#| || bgcolor=#||| Japan, Korean Peninsula, Russian Far East ||  ||  || 
|-
| Talas ||  || bgcolor=#| || bgcolor=#| || bgcolor=#||| Japan ||  Unknown ||  || 
|-
| Noru (Karding) ||  || bgcolor=#| || bgcolor=#| || bgcolor=#||| Philippines, Vietnam, Laos, Thailand, Cambodia ||  ||  || 
|-
| Kulap ||  || bgcolor=#| || bgcolor=#|  || bgcolor=#||| None ||  None ||  None || 
|-
| TD ||  || bgcolor=#| || bgcolor=#|  || bgcolor=#||| None ||  None ||  None || 
|-
| Roke (Luis) ||  || bgcolor=#| || bgcolor=#|  || bgcolor=#||| Daitō Islands ||  None ||  None || 
|-
| Maymay ||  || bgcolor=#| || bgcolor=#| || bgcolor=#||| Philippines ||  ||  || 
|-
| 21W ||  || bgcolor=#| || bgcolor=#| || bgcolor=#||| None ||  None ||  None || 
|-
| Sonca ||  || bgcolor=#| || bgcolor=#| || bgcolor=#||| Vietnam, Laos, Cambodia ||  ||  10 ||
|-
| Nesat (Neneng) ||  || bgcolor=#| || bgcolor=#| || bgcolor=#||| Philippines, Taiwan, South China, Vietnam, Cambodia, Laos ||  ||  None || 
|-
| Haitang ||  || bgcolor=#| || bgcolor=#| || bgcolor=#||| None ||  None ||  None ||
|-
| 25W (Obet) ||  || bgcolor=#| || bgcolor=#|  || bgcolor=#||| Philippines ||  Unknown ||  || 
|-
| Nalgae (Paeng) ||  || bgcolor=#| || bgcolor=#|  || bgcolor=#||| Philippines, Hong Kong, Macau, South China ||   ||  || 
|-
| Banyan (Queenie) ||  || bgcolor=#| || bgcolor=#|  || bgcolor=#||| Caroline Islands, Palau ||  None ||  None || 
|-
| Yamaneko ||  || bgcolor=#| || bgcolor=#|  || bgcolor=#||| None ||  None ||  None || 
|-
| Pakhar (Rosal) ||  || bgcolor=#| || bgcolor=#|  || bgcolor=#||| Philippines ||  None ||  ||  
|-

See also

 Weather of 2022
 Tropical cyclones in 2022
 Pacific typhoon season
 2022 Atlantic hurricane season
 2022 Pacific hurricane season
 2022 North Indian Ocean cyclone season
 South-West Indian Ocean cyclone seasons: 2021–22, 2022–23
 Australian region cyclone seasons: 2021–22, 2022–23
 South Pacific cyclone seasons: 2021–22, 2022–23

Notes

References

External links

Articles which contain graphical timelines
Pacific typhoon seasons
Tropical cyclones in 2022